This page lists the World Best Year Performance in the year 2010 in both the men's and the women's hammer throw. The main event during this season were the 2010 European Championships in Athletics in Barcelona, Spain, where the final of the men's competition was held on July 28, 2010. The women had their final five days later, on July 30, 2010.

Men

Records

2010 World Year Ranking

Women

Records

2010 World Year Ranking

References
IAAF

2010
Hammer Throw Year Ranking, 2010